The Chilean Joint Peacekeeping Operations Centre (Spanish: Centro Conjunto para Operaciones de Paz de Chile), also known as CECOPAC (Centro Conjunto para Operaciones de Paz de Chile) is a peacekeeping force led by Chile. It was the Chilean aid to the United Nations. Led by Colonel Valentín Segura, the force was pre-set in many situations, including parts of the Afghanistan War.

Background
In 1935, Chile formed the Neutral Military Committee during the Boreal Chaco conflict between Bolivia and Paraguay. In 1949 to this day, Chile also joined in the United Nations mission in India and Pakistan. As a part of the UN, Chile decided to send their troops in their events as peacekeepers, not soldiers. Chile served in several other "wars" as peacekeepers following the aftermath. They were also sent to countries that were hostile environments, like Cambodia, or recently wrecked countries like Haiti. They first really did fighting when in 2003 some of their men were hired as Private security contractors. From then on, they have been continuing their work under command of Colonel Valentín Segura, who took over the post of director in 2007. Segura, who led Operation Shua Polar I in the Chilean Antarctic Territory, also served in Bosnia and Herzegovina.

CECOPAC today
Formed in 2002, CECOPAC replaced the Neutral Military Committee. It serves in the Middle East, India, Pakistan, and wherever else the United Nations tend to launch their peacekeeping missions in.

References

United Nations peacekeeping
Military operations other than war
2002 establishments in Chile
Military of Chile
Chilean Joint Peacekeeping Operations Center personnel